Moti Bodek (born 1961) is an Israeli architect. He is the CEO of Bodek Architects based in Tel Aviv and a Professor of Architecture at Bezalel Academy of Art and Design, Jerusalem & at Tel Aviv University.

Biography
Moti Bodek was born and grew up in Haifa. He served in the Israeli security forces from 1979 to 1985. In 1989 he graduated with honors from the department of Environmental Design at Bezalel Academy of Art and Design Jerusalem, and in 1990 he earned his B.Arch. degree from the Faculty of Architecture in the Technion, Haifa.

From 1987 to 1993 Bodek worked at the Avraham Yasky architectural company at Tel Aviv, while also in 1990 founding his own firm, Bodek Architects.

In 1991 he began teaching at Bezalel, and in 1995 he received his M.P.A degree from Clark University, Massachusetts, United States.

From 2001 to 2004, Bodek served as deputy head of the Architecture Department at Ariel University.

Currently he is a Professor of Architecture and the Head of Lecturers Organization at Bezalel Academy of Art and Design.

Bodek was one of the founders of staff organization boards at higher education institutions, and also served as Deputy Chairman.

Bodek engaged in the research, design and construction of projects based on the discipline of biomimicry (imitation of life).

Selected projects
 Eilat Sports Center
 Tiberias Football Stadium
 Meron School, Tel Aviv
 Kfar Qassem Football Stadium
 Tel Aviv University Sports Centre
 New neighborhood near Beersheba River Park
 Two pedestrian bridges, Ashdod
 Sea Sports Centre & Sailing Club Eilat
 Synagogue, Be'er Ganim near Ashkelon
 Bikur Holim Hospital, Jerusalem
 The Russian Embassy house on Rothschild Boulevard, Tel Aviv
 Bus stops on Highway 44 (Israel)
 Tel Aviv Central Bus Station

Exhibitions
Biomimicry - Architecture influenced by systems of nature, Exhibition of Buildings & Projects by Architect Moti Bodek. International Week, FHP University of Applied Sciences, freiLand Potsdam Germany. 12-16 May 2014.
BIO-DESIGN: HYBRID FABRICTIONSׂ, Group Exhibition. Master's Program in Integrated Design, Research Gallery, Design Faculty, HIT Holon Institute of Technology, Israel. 28 April-19 May 2015
La Biennale di Venezia, The 15th International Architecture Exhibition Venice, Italy, May 28th to November 27th 2016.

See also
Architecture of Israel

References

External links

 (P.33-36 Hebrew) 

"New design: The turtle stadium of Tiberias". StadiumDB.com. 17 April 2016

Israeli architects
Architecture firms of Israel
Jewish architects
1961 births
Living people
People from Haifa
Academic staff of Bezalel Academy of Arts and Design
Academic staff of Tel Aviv University
Technion – Israel Institute of Technology
Bezalel Academy of Arts and Design alumni
Technion – Israel Institute of Technology alumni
Clark University alumni
Academic staff of Ariel University